Musammat Hosne Ara Sharifa Begum (2 September 1935 – 20 May 2012) was known by the stage name Sultana Zaman. She was a Bangladeshi film actress and producer. In 2009, she was given Bangladesh National Film Award for Lifetime Achievement — the first since the award's inception in 1975.

Background and family 
Zaman was born on 2 September 1935 to Syed Abdur Razzaq, an officer of the zamindar of Natore and Rahima Khatun. Zaman passed SSC examination from Natore Girls' School, HSC examination from Rajshahi College. In 1956, she married QM Zaman, the first chief cameraman of Film Development Corporation (FDC) of the then East Pakistan and the cameramen of films including the first Bangla full-length commercial film Mukh O Mukhosh (1956).

Career
Zaman debuted her acting career in 1959 through the film Matir Pahar produced by SM Parvez and directed by Mohiuddin. She adopted her name as Sultana Zaman through the film Anek Diner Chena (1964) directed by Khan Ataur Rahman.

Zaman produced two films, Bhanumati (1969) and Chhadmabeshi. Besides, she was the presenter of the lyric program Chhayachhanda in commercial service of radio and acted on radio plays including Kritodaser Hashi, Tajmahal and Zafran.

Works

Awards
 Bangladesh National Film Award for Lifetime Achievement (2009)
 Chitrakash Award
 National Award (2011) by the Bangladesh Mahila Parishad

References

External links
 

1935 births
2012 deaths
Bangladeshi film actresses
National Film Award (Bangladesh) for Lifetime Achievement recipients
Burials at Mirpur Martyred Intellectual Graveyard
People from Natore District
Rajshahi College alumni